The Writer's Workbench (wwb) is a grammar checker created by Lorinda Cherry and Nina Macdonald of Bell Labs.  It is perhaps the earliest grammar checker to receive wide usage on Unix systems.

Capabilities
wwb's utilities were capable of analysing text for parts of speech, and for word and sentence length, and of comparing the results to established norms.

The Writer's Workbench was meant to help students learn to edit their work:

My feeling about a lot of those tools is their value in education is as much pointing out to people who are learning to write that they have choices and make choices when they do it. They don't think of a writing task as making choices per se. Once they get it on paper they think it's cast in stone. So it makes them edit.

Polling at Colorado State University in the 1980s indicated that wwb was well received by students and faculty. Additional analysis in the 1980s indicated close correlation between wwb's assessments and essay grading rubrics.

Package contents
As of 1983, the wwb package contained 29 utilities. As of 1986, this had increased to around 35–40 utilities:

History and successors
The wwb package was included with AT&T UNIX in the late 1970s and early 1980s and received wide distribution as a result. However, wwb was not included with Version 7 Unix, and gradually became abandonware. Various successors arose, based closely upon wwb, such as the commercial Grammatik packages for IBM PCs.

The GNU operating system contains free software implementations of several wwb utilities, such as spell, style and diction. As of early 2019, the look utility had not yet been ported to GNU, but its implementation from 4.4BSD-Lite is available as free software, for example via Debian.

See also
 LanguageTool
 Programmer's Workbench (PWB/UNIX)

References

Bibliography

 
 
 
 
 
 

Grammar checkers
Unix software